Scoulton Mere is a  biological Site of Special Scientific Interest west of Wymondham in Norfolk.

The principal ecological interest of this site lies in the swamp, fen and bog flora on islands in the mere and along the shore. The largest island, called Scoulton Heath, is mainly covered in sphagnum moss, and other plants include the nationally rare crested buckler fern.

There is no public access to the site.

References

Sites of Special Scientific Interest in Norfolk